Mafia Queens of Mumbai: Stories of women from the ganglands is an Indian 2011 non-fiction crime novel written by Hussain Zaidi with original research by reporter Jane Borges. It tells 13 true stories of women who were involved in criminal activities in Mumbai. Rajkummar Rao, Radhika Apte and Kalki Koechlin provided their voice for its audio book for audible.

Reception
Matt Daniels of Mint wrote, "These are a handful of women who lived fearlessly, and Mafia Queens celebrates their spirit. But the real heroes are Zaidi and Borges, who ventured undaunted into the dark corners of the city to illuminate them." Zara Murao of Hindustan Times reviewed: "It’s hard to tell how much of Mafia Queens is apocryphal, given that each of the 13 stories is pieced together from official documents, case reports and anecdotes from the subject’s family and acquaintances. The account, though, vibrates with drama, intrigue and unexpected pathos." 

J. Srinivasan of The Hindu Business Line noted that it was "really fascinating to read how these women slip into different roles so effortlessly and efficiently." Alpana Chowdhury of Daily News and Analysis mentioned, "From the choice of the women they have portrayed, to the racy style of writing, everything is calculated to make the book a page-turner." Kankana Basu of The Hindu felt, "Mafia Queens, by virtue of its very stark simplicity is a revelation, a rare treat for the discerning lover of crime stories."

Adaptation
Director Sanjay Leela Bhansali announced a film titled Gangubai Kathiawadi which is based on the chapter of Gangubai Kothewali from the book. The film, starring Alia Bhatt in the title role, released on 25 February, 2022.

References

External link
Mafia Queens of Mumbai at Goodreads

2011 Indian novels
Indian crime novels
Indian non-fiction books
Crime in Maharashtra
Indian novels adapted into films